John McCurdy may refer to:

John Alexander Douglas McCurdy (1886–1961), lieutenant-governor of Nova Scotia and aviator
John McCurdy (architect) (1824–1885), Irish architect
John McCurdy (tennis) (born 1960), Australian tennis pro from the 1980s
John McCurdy (baseball) born 1981, professional baseball player

See also
John Macurdy, born McCurdy, operatic singer